Kenneth Patrick Bordelon (born August 26, 1954) is a former professional American football player who played linebacker for six seasons for the New Orleans Saints. Bordelon played college football at Louisiana State University and was selected in fifth round of the 1976 NFL Draft by the Los Angeles Rams.

References

Players of American football from New Orleans
American football linebackers
LSU Tigers football players
New Orleans Saints players
1954 births
Living people